Susan Lynette Smith  (born 24 January 1951 in Ulverstone, Tasmania) was an independent member of the Tasmanian Legislative Council in the electoral division of Montgomery. She was first elected to the division of Leven in 1997 but the seat was abolished in 1999 and she transferred to the newly created seat of Montgomery.  She was elected unopposed in 2007 and retired on 4 May 2013.  From June 2008 to May 2013 she was President of the Legislative Council, the first woman to hold that office. Smith is married with a grown son and daughter.

References

External links
 

|-

|-

1951 births
Living people
Members of the Tasmanian Legislative Council
Presidents of the Tasmanian Legislative Council
Independent members of the Parliament of Tasmania
Members of the Order of Australia
People from Ulverstone, Tasmania
20th-century Australian politicians
20th-century Australian women politicians
21st-century Australian politicians
21st-century Australian women politicians
Women members of the Tasmanian Legislative Council

de:Sue Smith